Sarah Troël (born 12 July 1986) is a French canoeist. She competed in the women's K-4 500 metres event at the 2016 Summer Olympics.

References

External links
 

1986 births
Living people
French female canoeists
Olympic canoeists of France
Canoeists at the 2016 Summer Olympics
Sportspeople from Rennes
European Games competitors for France
Canoeists at the 2015 European Games
Canoeists at the 2019 European Games
21st-century French women